Khatt Atui is a wadi in North Africa. This dry riverbed begins near Aousserd in the disputed territory of Western Sahara and runs southwest through the Dakhlet Nouadhibou and Inchiri Regions of Mauritania, ending at the Baie d'Aouati on the Atlantic coast east of Iouik, Mauritania in Banc d'Arguin National Park.

The Mauritanian settlements of Chami (on the highway between Nouakchott and Nouadhibou), Imkebden and N'Talfa are located along the wadi, as is the Tasiast gold mine.

Khatt Atui has been suggested as the location of the lower reaches of a major ancient river, dubbed the Tamanrasett paleoriver, that flowed through the Sahara to the Arguin Basin during humid episodes in the late Quaternary. Early Neolithic archaeological sites have been found along the Mauritanian portion of the wadi.

References

Rivers of Mauritania
Rivers of Western Sahara
Wadis
Former rivers